is a loosely defined form of Japanese pop music that emerged in the late 1970s and peaked in popularity during the 1980s. It was originally termed as an offshoot of Japan's Western-influenced "new music", but came to include a wide range of styles – including AOR, soft rock, R&B, funk, and boogie – that were associated with the country's nascent economic boom and leisure class. It was also identified with new technologies such as the Walkman, cars with built-in cassette decks and FM stereos, and various electronic musical instruments.

There is no unified consensus among scholars regarding the definition of city pop. In Japan, the tag simply referred to music that projected an "urban" feel and whose target demographic was urbanites. Many of the artists did not embrace the Japanese influences of their predecessors, and instead, largely drew from American soft rock, boogie, and funk. Some examples may also feature tropical flourishes or elements taken from disco, jazz fusion, Okinawan, Latin and Caribbean music. Singer-songwriter Tatsuro Yamashita, who was among the genre's pioneers and most successful artists, is sometimes called the "king" of city pop.

City pop lost mainstream appeal after the 1980s and was derided by younger generations of Japanese. In the early 2010s, partly through the instigation of music-sharing blogs and Japanese reissues, city pop gained an international online following as well as becoming a touchstone for the sample-based microgenres known as vaporwave and future funk.

Definitions

Definitions of "city pop" have varied and many of the artists tagged with the genre have played in styles that are significantly different from each other. Yutaka Kimura, an author of numerous books about city pop, defined the genre as "urban pop music for those with urban lifestyles." In 2015, Ryotaro Aoki wrote in The Japan Times:

Jon Blistein of Rolling Stone concurred that city pop was "less a strict genre term than a broad vibe classification." According to Japan Archival Series supervisor Yosuke Kitazawa, there "were no restrictions on style or a specific genre that we wanted to convey with these songs" but that it "was music made by city people, for city people." Kitazawa identified two distinct styles that exemplified city pop: "the former a lush, tropical romp, the latter a thumping rug-cutter".

Pitchforks Joshua Minsoo Kim called it "a vague descriptor for Japanese music that incorporated jazz and R&B", while PopMatters Chris Ingalls categorized it as "a type of soft rock/AOR/funk". Wax Poetics Ed Motta offered, "City Pop is really AOR and soft rock but with some funk and boogie too. Because when you hear funkier City Pop tunes, you hear not only the influence, but in some parts they steal from groups like Skyy, BB&Q Band, and those kinda American boogie and funk groups." An Electronic Beats writer characterized city pop as Japan's "answer to synth pop and disco".

Musical origins
Musically, city pop applies relatively advanced songwriting and arranging techniques – such as major seventh and diminished chords – that are drawn directly from the American soft rock of the era (bands such as Steely Dan and the Doobie Brothers). Yutaka cited the band Happy End as "ground zero" for the genre, whereas Motta traces it to the mid-1970s with the work of Haruomi Hosono and Tatsuro Yamashita. Vice contributor Rob Arcand similarly credited Hosono as a "key influence" on city pop. In the mid-1970s, Hosono founded the band Tin Pan Alley, which fused southern R&B, northern soul and jazz fusion with Hawaiian and Okinawan tropical flourishes. In the view of Fact Mags Mikey I.Q. Jones, this led to the style of music that would be dubbed "city pop".

The genre became closely tied to the tech boom in Japan during the 1970s and 1980s. Some of the Japanese technologies which influenced city pop included the Walkman, cars with built-in cassette decks and FM stereos, and various electronic musical instruments such as the Casio CZ-101 and Yamaha CS-80 synthesizers and Roland TR-808 drum machine. According to Blistein, electronic instruments and gadgets "allowed musicians to actualise the sounds in their heads" and cassette decks "allowed fans to dub copies of albums". According to Blistein: "An opulent amalgamation of pop, disco, funk, R&B, boogie, jazz fusion, Latin, Caribbean and Polynesian music, the genre was inextricably tied to a tech-fueled economic bubble and the wealthy new leisure class it created."

Popularity

City pop became a distinct regional genre that peaked in popularity during the 1980s. According to Vice, the most popular figures of the genre were "accomplished composers and producers in their own right, with artists like Tatsuro Yamashita and Toshiki Kadomatsu incorporating complex arrangements and songwriting techniques into their hits, ... The booming economy also made it easier for them to get label funding". Yamashita is sometimes referred to as the "king" of city pop. City pop also influenced instrumental jazz fusion bands such as Casiopea and T-Square, which subsequently influenced Japanese video game music. City pop's influence also spread to Indonesia, leading to the development of a local style known as pop kreatif. The genre lost mainstream appeal after the 1980s. In the description of Kitazawa, "Many Japanese people who grew up with this kind of music considered city pop as cheesy, mainstream, disposable music, going so far as calling it 'shitty pop'."

Since the 2010s, city pop has seen a resurgence with artists such as Mariya Takeuchi gaining an international online following, as well as becoming a touchstone for the sample-based microgenres known as vaporwave and future funk. Kim credited "Blogspot blogs and Japanese reissues" circa 2010 with "introduc[ing] music nerds to a strain of AOR, funk, disco, and yacht rock trafficked under the amorphous term ... The music had largely been neglected by Westerners and derided by many Japanese as cheesy, but as YouTube algorithms launched songs into the wider collective consciousness, city pop surged in popularity ..." In 2020, The Japan Times contributor Patrick St. Michel reported that, "Abroad, boutique labels are reissuing rare records or releasing compilations, though millions have largely experienced city pop through songs such as [Takeuchi's 1984 song] "Plastic Love" or the seemingly endless playlists backed by anime snippets on YouTube." Another song of the genre that regained popularity was "Mayonaka no Door (Stay with Me)" by Miki Matsubara on TikTok in 2020, when Japanese parents’ responses to the song were recorded on their children’s phones.

See also
 List of city pop artists
 Beach music
 Yacht rock

References

Further reading

External links

 
 
 

Japanese styles of music
Soft rock
1970s in Japanese music
1980s in Japanese music
20th-century music genres
Music in Tokyo
J-pop